The Kattegat is a  sea area bounded by the Jutlandic peninsula in the west, the Danish Straits islands of Denmark and the Baltic Sea to the south and the provinces of Bohuslän, Västergötland, Halland and Skåne in Sweden in the east. The Baltic Sea drains into the Kattegat through the Danish Straits. The sea area is a continuation of the Skagerrak and may be seen as a bay of the North Sea, but in traditional Scandinavian usage, this is not the case.

The Kattegat is a rather shallow sea and can be very difficult and dangerous to navigate because of the many sandy and stony reefs and tricky currents, which often shift. In modern times, artificial seabed channels have been dug, many reefs have been dredged by either sand pumping or stone fishing, and a well-developed light signaling network has been installed, to safeguard the very heavy international traffic of this small sea.

There are several large cities and major ports in the Kattegat, including, in descending size, Gothenburg, Aarhus, Aalborg, Halmstad and Frederikshavn.

Geography

According to the definition established in a 1932 convention signed by Denmark, Norway and Sweden (registered in the League of Nations Treaty Series 1933–1934), the northern boundary between the Kattegat and Skagerrak are found at the northernmost point of Skagen on Jutland, while the southern boundary towards Øresund is found at the tip of Kullen Peninsula in Scania.

Major waterways that drain into the Kattegat are the rivers of Göta älv at Gothenburg, together with the Lagan, Nissan, Ätran and Viskan in the province of Halland on the Swedish side, and the river of Gudenå in Jutland, in Denmark.

The main islands of the Kattegat are Samsø, Læsø and Anholt; the latter two are, due to their relatively dry climate, perceived as belonging to "the Danish desert belt".

A number of noteworthy coastal areas abut the Kattegat, including the Kullaberg Nature Reserve in Scania, Sweden, which contains a number of rare species and a scenic rocky shore, the town of Mölle, which has a picturesque harbour and views into the Kullaberg, and Skagen at the northern tip of Denmark.

Since the 1950s, a bridge project usually referred to as Kattegatbroen (the Kattegat Bridge) connecting Jutland and Zealand across the Kattegat has been considered. Since the late 2000s, the project has seen a renewed interest from several influential politicians in Denmark. The bridge is usually envisioned as connecting Hov (a village south of Odder in the Aarhus area) with Samsø and Kalundborg.

Extent
The International Hydrographic Organization defines the limits of the "Kattegat, Sound and Belts" (that is, the Kattegat, Øresund, Great Belt, and Little Belt) as follows:

Etymology
It derives from late medieval navigation jargon, in which captains of the Hanseatic trading fleets would compare the Danish Straits to a passage so tight that even a cat would have difficulty squeezing its way through, owing to the many reefs and shoals. The name of the Copenhagen street Kattesundet has a comparable etymological meaning, namely 'narrow passage', .

An archaic name for both the Skagerrak and Kattegat was the Norwegian Sea or Jutland Sea (Knýtlinga saga mentions the name Jótlandshaf).

History
Control of the Kattegat, and access to it, have been important throughout the history of international seafaring. Until the completion of the Eider Canal in 1784, the Kattegat was the only sea route into and out of the Baltic region.

Beginning in 1429 in the Middle Ages, the Danish royal family – and later the state of Denmark – prospered greatly from the Sound dues, a toll charged for passage through the Øresund, while Copenhagen provided shelter, trade and repair opportunities and protection from piracy. The dues were eventually lifted in 1857.

Biology 

In the Kattegat, the salinity has a pronounced two-layer structure. The upper layer has a salinity between 18‰ and 26‰ and the lower layer – separated by a strong halocline at around  – has a salinity between 32‰ and 34‰. The lower layer consists of inflowing seawater from the Skagerrak, with a salinity on level with most other coastal seawaters, while the upper layer consists of inflowing seawater from the Baltic Sea and has a much lower salinity, comparable to brackish water, but still a great deal higher than the rest of the Baltic sea. These two opposing flows transport a net surplus of  seawater from the Baltic to the Skagerrak every year. During stronger winds, the layers in the Kattegat are completely mixed in some places, such as the Great Belt, so the overall salinity is highly variable in this small sea. This sets some unique conditions for the sealife here.

Cold seeps, locally known as bubbling reefs, are found in the northern Kattegat. The seeps rely on methane deposited during the Eemian period and during calm weather the bubbles can sometimes be seen on the water surface. Because of their unique status, the Kattegat bubbling reefs receive a level of protection and are recognized as a Natura 2000 habitat (type 1180) by the European Union (EU).

Ecological collapse
The Kattegat was one of the first marine dead zones to be noted in the 1970s, when scientists began studying how intensive industrial activities affected the natural world. Since then, studies and research has provided much insight into processes like eutrophication, and how to deal with it. Denmark and the EU have initiated costly and far-reaching domestic projects in order to stop, repair and prevent these environmentally destructive and economically damaging processes since the first Action Plan for the Aquatic Environment in 1985, and are now busy implementing the fourth Action Plan. The action plans sums up a broad range of initiatives and includes the so-called Nitrate Directives. The action plans have generally been viewed as a success, although the work is not finished and all goals are not completely met yet.

Protections and regulation 

Due to the very heavy sea traffic and many large coastal settlements, the Kattegat has been designated as a Sulphur Emission Control Area as part of the Baltic Sea since 2006. As from 1 January 2016 the benchmark for sulphur in fuels was lowered to 0.1%.

Several larger areas of the Kattegat are designated as Natura 2000 and under various bird protections such as the Ramsar Convention. The remaining larger shallow reefs are among the protections, as they are important spawning and feeding grounds for fish and marine mammals and they support a thriving but threatened biodiversity. Protected areas includes:

Denmark
 Grenen
 The Bay of Aalborg, comprising a  shallow sea area.
 Beach meadows on Læsø and the stony reefs south of the island
 Anholt and the sea north of the island.

Sweden
 The Nordre älv estuary north of Gothenburg. An important spot for migratory birds and fish.
 The Vrångö archipelago (Swedish: Vrångöskärgården), part of the Archipelago of Gothenburg. An important reproduction area for seabirds and seals.
 Kungsbacka Fjord. A shallow water fjord between Gothenburg and Varberg, including important salt marshes. 
 Hovs Hallar 
 Kullaberg Nature Reserve

Gallery

See also
 Øresund Bridge

References

External links

 
 

 
Denmark–Sweden border
International straits
Straits of Denmark
Straits of Sweden
Straits of the Baltic Sea
Landforms of Västra Götaland County
Landforms of Skåne County
Landforms of Halland County